Bailrigg FM (formerly known as University Radio Bailrigg (URB) and Radio Bailrigg) is a student radio station at Lancaster University. It operates in a music format predominantly featuring pop, but also broadcasts news, drama, comedy, and entertainment. During evening and weekend hours, programming moves to specialist content where presenters are free (within reason) to play whatever they wish.

Bailrigg is one of the oldest student radio stations in the country, as well as being the first student station to broadcast on FM. It airs 24 hours a day, seven days a week, all year round. Bailrigg first broadcast on FM as part of a one-month, 25W Restricted Services Licence in March 1994 under the directorship of Paul Dale. It had previously applied for a licence in September 1993 but was turned down by the Radio Authority due to the launch of The Bay in March of that year.

It originally broadcast to the university on 312m Medium Wave using an inductive loop aerial system around the various halls of residence. Now listeners can tune in on campus on 95.3 MHz, or listen anywhere in the world using the station's live webstream. Bailrigg holds several large events throughout the year, including a seven-day Freshers' Week outside broadcast and coverage of the Lancaster University Students' Union (LUSU) sabbatical elections. During the Roses Tournament the station joins with University Radio York (URY) to provide programming across both campuses.

The station has received several national Student Radio Awards over the years, including Best Website, Best Station Sound and more recently Best Technical Achievement.

It was announced in April 2019 that LUSU would stop funding the license required to broadcast FM frequencies, and as such the station would only be available online from August onwards. After protest over the decision however, funding was given in August for the license to be renewed.

On December 7th 2022 at 12PM, the station's frequency was changed from 87.7 FM to 95.3 FM.

History

 1968 – Students at York University get permission to test-transmit programmes on Medium Wave, inspiring Lancaster to follow suit.
 1969 - After problems with an over-eager student starting his own pirate radio station, permission is finally given to proceed with the project.
 1971 - The initial aerial and studio equipment is installed.
 1972 - URB is forced off air by the government for transmitting without a full licence.
 1973 - A new antenna system is installed and URB gains a full licence from the government.
 1974 - Twin studios are built in Fylde College.
 1994 - First four-week 25W licence to broadcast on 87.7 MHz (under the name Bailrigg FM) is received. The broadcasts covered the City of Lancaster (including Morecambe). Reception was reported as far afield as Preston, Blackpool and Barrow-in-Furness.
 1995 - A second four-week FM licence is received, again on 87.7 MHz.
 1996 - URB gains a licence to broadcast all year round on the FM band, although on a smaller power output to cover the campus only. The station name is changed permanently to Bailrigg FM.
 2004 - Bailrigg FM is awarded an extended licence to transmit across Lancaster and Morecambe for a week as part of the university's 40th anniversary celebrations.
 2006 - Bailrigg FM moves to new studios in Furness College
 2012 - Bailrigg FM is awarded £8,500 in funding from the University's Alumni Fund in order to purchase outside broadcast equipment.
 2013 - Bailrigg FM is awarded £65,000 in Capex funds from LUSU in order to renovate their studios. This will keep Bailrigg FM on air for at least another 5 years.
 2019 - LUSU announced it would strip Bailrigg FM of funding for its license. Due to widespread disapproval this decision was ultimately reversed.
 2022 - Bailrigg FM's FM license was amended, changing its frequency from 87.7FM @ 50mw to 95.3FM @ 2w. The increased power should allow coverage of the entire campus.

Awards

Student Radio Awards 
The following are Student Radio Awards presented by the Student Radio Association

Amplify Awards 
The following are Amplify Awards (formerly known as I Love Student Radio Awards) presented at the annual SRACon by the Student Radio Association.

Lancaster University Students' Union Awards 
The following are awards presented by Lancaster University Students' Union.

Notable alumni
 Richard Allinson
 James May
 Paul Cornell
 Andy Serkis
 James Masterton
 Paul Dale
 Louis Barfe

References

External links
 95.3 Bailrigg FM Website

Radio stations in Lancashire
Student radio in the United Kingdom
Radio stations established in 1969
Culture of Lancaster University